Derek Heasley (born 15 January 1972 in Lisburn, Northern Ireland) is an Irish cricketer. He is a right-handed batsman and right arm medium pace bowler. He made his debut for Ireland against Surrey on 14 May 1996 and has played for them 60 times in all, including two ICC Trophy tournaments in 1997 and 2001. He also represented Northern Ireland in the cricket tournament of the 1998 Commonwealth Games.

References

External links
CricketEurope profile
Cricket Archive profile

Irish cricketers
1972 births
Living people
Commonwealth Games competitors for Northern Ireland
Cricketers at the 1998 Commonwealth Games
Cricketers from Northern Ireland
Sportspeople from Lisburn